The Asháninka are an indigenous people of Peru and the Acre State of Brazil.

Asháninka may also refer to:

Asháninka language
Asháninka, or Axininca language